PP-28 Gujrat-I is a Constituency of Provincial Assembly of Punjab.

General elections 2018

General elections 2013

General elections 2008

See also
 PP-27 Jhelum-III
 PP-29 Gujrat-II

References

Provincial constituencies of Punjab, Pakistan